Jeff Williams (born 16 August 1988) is a South Africa born English professional rugby union player. Williams previously played Rugby sevens for England and was a member of the team which won the Tokyo Sevens  tournament in 2015.

Early life 
Williams was born in South Africa to an English father and grew up in the suburb of Sunnyridge. He attended George Randell Primary School, in Greenfields from grade one to seven. He then moved on to Selborne College where he finished his high school career. Williams played Rugby Union for the Hamiltons club in Cape Town, and was a part of the Sharks Academy. Williams then signed for RC Chateaurenard  playing in French Fédérale 1.

Rugby Sevens 
Williams was a member of the England Sevens team from 2012-2015 playing at prop or wing, he made his debut in the 2012 Marriot London Sevens. Williams opportunity to join the England Sevens team came about after his father contacted the RFU to make them aware he was eligible to play for England. Williams was contacted by Ben Ryan who offered him an opportunity to try out for the team.

Williams was a member of the England team which won the 2015 Tokyo Sevens Tournament. He scored a total of 39 tries in 22 games throughout his career.

Rugby Union 
In April 2015 it was announced that Williams was returning to Rugby Union having signed for Bath for the 2015/16 season. Williams' contract was extended for one year in March 2016.

Williams made his Aviva Premiership debut for Bath on 7 November 2015 in a 14-45 Victory over London Irish

Honours
2012 Wellington Sevens Winners

2013 Rugby World Cup Sevens Silver Medal

2015 Japan Sevens Winners

References

External links 
  Bath Rugby Home Page

1988 births
Living people
English expatriate rugby union players
English expatriate sportspeople in France
English rugby union players
Male rugby sevens players
Rugby union players from East London, Eastern Cape